William Gosse may refer to:
William Gosse (explorer) (1842-1881), Australian explorer
William Gosse (surgeon), his father, medical practitioner in South Australia
William Gosse (MP) for Bridgwater (UK Parliament constituency)

See also
William Gosse Hay, brother-in-law and nephew of William Christie Gosse
William Goss (disambiguation)